Lycée Français René Descartes Kinshasa is a French international school in Kinshasa, Democratic Republic of the Congo, established in 1964. It serves maternelle (preschool) through terminale, the final year of lycée (senior high school). In 2016–17 it had about 950 students.

There are two campuses in Gombe, Site Gombe and Site Kalemie; the latter is across from the residence of the Ambassador of France.

References

External links

  lfrdrdc.org

Kinshasa
Schools in Kinshasa
International schools in the Democratic Republic of the Congo
Educational institutions established in 1964
1964 establishments in the Democratic Republic of the Congo
Lukunga District
Elementary and primary schools in the Democratic Republic of the Congo
High schools and secondary schools in the Democratic Republic of the Congo
International high schools